Barcea is a commune in Galați County, Western Moldavia, Romania with a population of 6,132 people. It is composed of two villages, Barcea and Podoleni.

Natives
 Dorin Manole

References

Communes in Galați County
Localities in Western Moldavia